The 2021 Antenna Awards ceremony is scheduled for 18 September 2021, instead of 29 May 2021 at the Deakin Edge at Federation Square in Melbourne. The ceremony was announced on 15 July 2019 and will recognize excellence in Australian community television of the eligibility period, running from 1 July 2019 to 19 March 2021.

This will be the 10th Antenna Awards ceremony and will be broadcast live on C31 Melbourne and Channel 44 Adelaide. Nominations will be accepted from producers of programs that aired on terrestrial community television – including the now-defunct WTV Perth – as well as satellite and cable channels Aurora and ICTV. Special consideration will also be given to programs scheduled to air before 30 June 2021.

Winners and nominees

References

External links
 Official website

 10
2021 television awards
2021 in Australian television
Australian community television
2020s in Melbourne